Narcissus (born 2nd century A.D.) was a Roman athlete, likely a wrestler, from the 2nd century AD. He assassinated the Roman emperor Commodus in 192 AD.

Life and work
He is best known to history as the assassin of the Roman Emperor Commodus, by whom he was employed as a wrestling partner and personal trainer in order to train Commodus for his self-indulgent appearances in the Colosseum as a gladiator. 

In 192 AD, several senators, led by Praetorian prefect Quintus Aemilius Laetus, recruited Narcissus to assassinate the emperor after a previous failed attempt by the conspirators.

On 31 December 192 AD, Commodus's concubine and conspirator Marcia poisoned Commodus's wine. The poison failed, so Narcissus entered Commodus's bedchamber. Commodus was supposedly in a drunken stupor after Marcia had poisoned him and Narcissus proceeded to strangle his master in his bathtub or, according to Herodian, in his bed.

Death
Narcissus died by execution during the series of civil wars after Commodus's death.

References

Ancient Roman sportspeople
Commodus
2nd-century births
Year of death missing
Ancient Roman assassins
Regicides
2nd-century Romans